Peregrin also known as bromodomain and PHD finger-containing protein 1 is a protein that in humans is encoded by the BRPF1 gene located on 3p26-p25. Peregrin is a multivalent chromatin regulator that recognizes different epigenetic marks and activates three histone acetyltransferases (Moz, Morf and Hbo1). BRPF1 contains two PHD fingers, one bromodomain and one chromo/Tudor-related Pro-Trp-Trp-Pro (PWWP) domain.

Function

Embryo development 

Brpf1 gene is very conserved and has a critical role in different developmental processes. Zebrafish BRPF1, which is coordinated by its particular set of PWWP domains, mediates Moz -dependent histone acetylation and maintains Hox genes expression throughout vertebrate development, hence determines the proper pharyngeal segmental identities. Furthermore, Brpf1 may not only has significant role for maintaining the anterior-posterior axis of the craniofacial skeleton, but also the dorsal-ventral axis of the caudal skeleton. Recent studies have shown that ablation of the mouse Brpf1 gene causes embryonic lethality at embryonic day 9.5. Specifically, Brpf1 regulates placenta vascular formation, neural tube closure, primitive hematopoiesis and embryonic fibroblast proliferation.

For the central nervous system, Brpf1 has high expression and is essential for the development of several important structures, including neocortex and dentate gyrus in the hippocampus. Brpf1 is dynamically expressed during forebrain development, especially the hippocampal neurogenesis. Brpf1 shares phenotypes with transcription factors Sox2, Tlx and Tbr2 in dentate gyrus development and has potential link to neural stem cells and progenitors. Except for the forebrain, Brpf1 is also required for the proper patterning of the craniofacial cartilage, which is derived from neural crest cells that migrate from the hindbrain.

Cancer development 

Recently, Brpf1 was reported to play the tumor suppressor or oncogenic role in several malignant tumors, including leukemia, medulloblastoma and endometrial stromal sarcoma. Brpf1 was considered a tumor suppressor gene because mutations in cancer cells appear to diminish the function of Brpf1 However, oncogenic role of Brpf1 is also possible in cancer. For example, Brpf1 can form a stable complex with Moz-Tif2, which could lead to the development of human acute myeloid leukemia (AML). There is another Brpf1 related complex Brpf1–Ing5–Eaf6, which also plays a direct role in cancer.

See also
Pattern formation
Regional specification

References

External links

Further reading